The Hauraki by-election of 1931 was a by-election held in the Hauraki electorate during the 23rd New Zealand Parliament, on 27 May 1931. It was caused by the death of incumbent MP Arthur Hall of the Reform Party and was won by Walter Massey.

Results
The following table gives the election results:

References 

Haur
Haurak
Politics of the Auckland Region